Lilapur is a village in Jasdan Gujarat, India.

References 

Villages in Rajkot district